The 2021 Bapco 6 Hours of Bahrain was an endurance sports car racing event held at the Bahrain International Circuit, Sakhir, Bahrain, on 30 October 2021. It served as the fifth and penultimate round of the 2021 FIA World Endurance Championship, and was the ninth running of the event as part of the championship. This race was a replacement for the cancelled race at Fuji Speedway, creating the first double-header in the championship's history, with the 8 Hours of Bahrain being run on 6 November 2021. The race was won by the Toyota GR010 Hybrid of Mike Conway, Kamui Kobayashi and José María López.

Qualifying

Qualifying Results 
Pole position winners in each class are marked in bold.

Race

Race Result 
The minimum number of laps for classification (70% of the overall winning car's distance) was 130 laps.

References 

8 Hours of Bahrain
Bahrain
6 Hours
6 Hours